Sharpen Your Sticks is the fifth album by The Bags. The album's title track, "Cavemen Rejoice", is also featured as a playable track on PlayStation 2 music game, Guitar Hero.

Track listing

2005 albums